The Syriac Catholic Eparchy of Cairo (informally Cairo of the Syriacs) is a Syriac Catholic Church ecclesiastical territory or eparchy of the Catholic Church in Egypt. It is immediately exempt to the Syriac Catholic Patriarch of Antioch, though not part of his or any other ecclesiastical province.

Its cathedral is the Cathedral of Our Lady of the Rosary in the episcopal see of Cairo.

History 
The Eparchy of Cairo was established on 3 December 1965 on territory previously without a Syriac Catholic ordinary or territory.

Ordinaries 

''Eparchs (Bishops) of Cairo
 Basile Pierre Habra (1963.07.06 – retired 1965.12.03), previously Titular Bishop of Batnæ of the Syriacs (1963.05.01 – 1963.07.06)
 Basile Moussa Daoud (1977.07.22 – 1994.07.01), later Metropolitan Archbishop of Homs of the Syriacs (Syria) ([1994.07.01] 1994.07.06 – 1998.10.13), Patriarch of Antioch of the Syriacs (Lebanon) ([1998.10.13] 1998.10.20 – 2001.01.08), President of Synod of the Syriac Catholic Church (1998.10.20 – 2001.01.08), Prefect of Congregation for the Oriental Churches (2000.11.25 – 2007.06.09), Grand Chancellor of Pontifical Oriental Institute (2000.11.25 – 2007.06.09), emeritate as Patriarch ad personam (2001.01.08 – 2012.04.07), created Cardinal-Patriarch (2001.02.21 – 2012.04.07)
 Clément-Joseph Hannouche (1995.06.24 – 2020.04.09), also Protosyncellus of Sudan and South Sudan (1997 – 2020.04.09)
Bishop Yacoub Camil Afram Antoine Semaan, Patriarchal Administrator of Cairo, Egypt (15 April, 2020 - Present), Patriarchal Exarch of Jerusalem and Patriarchal Administrator of Sudan and South Sudan.

List of Churches 
There are three churches in Cairo and Alexandria

 Cathedral of Our Lady of the Rosary in Cairo
 St. Catherine's Church - Heliopolis
 Church of the Heart of Jesus - Alexandria

See also 

 Dioceses of the Syriac Catholic Church
List of cathedrals in Egypt
Syriac Catholic Patriarchal Dependency of Sudan and South Sudan
Syriac Catholic Patriarchal Exarchate of Jerusalem

Source and External links 
 GCatholic with incumbent biography links
 Catholic Hierarchy

References 

Eastern Catholic dioceses in Africa
Syriac Catholic Church